The Liverpool Overhead Railway Southern Extension Tunnel, also known as the Dingle Extension Tunnel or variations thereof, stretches for half a mile from Herculaneum Dock to Dingle underground railway station, which was the southern terminus of the Liverpool Overhead Railway.

History
The tunnel was opened for operations on 31 December 1896.  Per the inscription on the tunnel entrance it was constructed under the chairmanship of William Bower Forwood by the engineer Charles Douglas Fox.  Additional engineers attributed on the portal are J. H. Greathead and S. B. Cottrell.  Contractors were H. M. Nowell and C. Braddock.

The tunnel portal at Herculaneum Dock is halfway up a cliff so that the track seamlessly run onto the elevated section of Overhead Railway. The track was electrified using the third rail. The inscription “LOR Southern Extension” lies above the portal. The tunnel was twin track and ended  beyond the end of Dingle station with twin sets of buffers embedded in the end wall of the tunnel.

The last trains ran on 30 December 1956. The former station was used as motor repair garage until the collapse of the station entrance in 2012, leaving the tunnel and station disused.  In April 2020 the private owner of the tunnel was looking to sell it with suggestions it could be used as a wine cellar.

References

Notes

Footnotes

Sources
 
 
 
 

Historic transport in Merseyside
Railway tunnels in England
Tunnels in Merseyside